Captain William Francis Dawson (???? – 29 March 1829) was a prominent road builder in British Ceylon (present-day Sri Lanka). An Engineer attached to the Royal Engineers, he was given the task of building the Colombo - Kandy Road linking Colombo and Kandy. The job took its toll on Dawson, who died before it was completed. It would be the first modern highway in the island. In the memory of Captain Dawson, the Dawson Tower was erected at Kadugannawa in the Kadugannawa Pass.

Notes

References

 

1829 deaths
People from British Ceylon
British colonial army officers
Ceylonese military personnel
Royal Engineers officers
Sri Lankan people of British descent

1743 births